Tim Linthorst (born 10 May 1994) is a Dutch professional footballer who plays as a centre back for AFC in the Dutch Tweede Divisie.

References

External links
 

1994 births
Living people
Association football defenders
Dutch footballers
De Graafschap players
Berliner AK 07 players
Amsterdamsche FC players
Eredivisie players
Eerste Divisie players
Tweede Divisie players
Sportspeople from Apeldoorn
Footballers from Gelderland
20th-century Dutch people
21st-century Dutch people